An opening act, also known as a warm-up act, support act, or supporting act, is an entertainment act (musical, comedic, or otherwise), that performs at a concert before the featured act, or "headliner". Rarely, an opening act may perform again at the end of the event, or perform with the featured act after both have had a set to themselves.

The opening act's performance serves to "warm up" the audience, making it appropriately excited and enthusiastic for the headliner. 

In rock music, the opening act will usually be an up-and-coming group with a smaller following than the headliner.  On long concert tours, different opening acts may be used for different legs of the tour. 

In comedy, a warm-up comedian or crowd warmer is a stand-up comedian who performs at a comedy club or before the filming of a television comedy in front of a studio audience.
More rarely, a comedian will open for a music concert. Their role is to make the audience feel integral to the show and encourage reactions during the show. They usually work alone and perform a comedy routine while also possibly explaining aspects of the show. In a television recording, they will also perform during commercial breaks. Some warm-up routines before talk shows involve giving prizes to audience members. The use of warm-ups in comedy dates back before television to radio shows.

In sports, an undercard is a preliminary bout or race between lesser known competitors, at a boxing, professional wrestling, horse racing, auto racing, or other sports event.

See also
Curtain raiser (drama)
Compère
Crowd manipulation

References

Concert tours
Concerts
Stand-up comedy
Broadcasting occupations